Tamerlane was launched in New Brunswick in 1824. She transferred her registry to Liverpool. She sailed between Scotland and Canada and then in 1828 sailed to India under a license from the British East India Company (EIC). After two voyages to India she returned to trading in the Western hemisphere. Her crew abandoned her in the Channel on 26 February 1848.

Career
Tamerlane, Corfield, from St John, New Brunswick, arrived at Cork on 22 October 1824. She was driven on shore on 26 October at Jackson's Dam, Liverpool during a gale. She was got off on the morning of 7 November, and was taken into the Brunswick Dock.

A letter from Belfast dated 30 November 1825 reported that Tamerlane, M'Killop, master, had been sailing from Quebec to the Clyde when she dragged her anchors the night before and had gone on shore at Gray's Point in Belfast Loch. She had lost her rudder and had become waterlogged. She was gotten off on 3 December and was bought up to near Gamoyle, where she remained waterlogged. She arrived at Greenock, Renfrewshire on 12 January 1826, still waterlogged.

Tamerlane first appeared in Lloyd's Register (LR) in the volume for 1826.

In 1813 the EIC had lost its monopoly on the trade between India and Britain. British ships were then free to sail to India or the Indian Ocean under a license from the EIC. 

On 28 July 1828, Captain Miller sailed Tamarlane to Bombay.

Then on 28 September 1829, Captain Miller again sailed Tamarlane to Bombay.

Fate
On 26 February 1848 her crew abandoned Tamarlane, James, master, in the Channel. She had lost her rudder and been dismasted. Her crew, except for four men who had drowned, were brought into Cherbourg.  A later report stated that a fifth man had been crushed to death and that she had been on a voyage returning from taking 500 emigrants to Carthagena from Aberystwyth.

Citations and references
Citations

References
 

1824 ships
Ships built in Canada
Age of Sail merchant ships of England
Maritime incidents in October 1824
Maritime incidents in November 1825
Maritime incidents in February 1848